Manuel da Silva Vieira Pinto (8 December 1923 – 30 April 2020) was a Portuguese-born Prelate of the Catholic Church in Mozambique.

Pinto was born in São Pedro de Aboim, Portugal and was ordained a priest on 7 August 1949. He was appointed bishop (later Archbishop) of the Archdiocese of Nampula on 21 April 1967 and consecrated on 29 June 1967, retiring on 16 November 2000. Pinto served as Apostolic Administrator to the Roman Catholic Archdiocese of Beira between 1971 and 1972 and the Diocese of Pemba from 1992 through 1998.

After the beginning of the activities of the FRELIMO liberation movement, in 1964, the times of terror of the Portuguese army started and Silva Vieira Pinto publicly protested against the government. His pious colleagues branded him as 'the Traitor of Nampula' and he was expelled from Mozambique. However, after a year he returned to a new Mozambique, now a socialist republic, and was welcomed with immense jubilation by his diocese.

References

External links
Catholic-Hierarchy

20th-century Roman Catholic bishops in Mozambique
21st-century Roman Catholic bishops in Mozambique
Portuguese expatriates in Mozambique
Portuguese Roman Catholic bishops in Africa
1923 births
2020 deaths
Roman Catholic bishops of Nampula
Roman Catholic archbishops of Nampula